The 1973 Milo International Tennis Classic, also known as the Manila Open, was a men's tennis tournament played on outdoor clay courts in Manila, the Philippines. It was the inaugural edition of the event and was held from 15 October through 21 October 1973. The tournament was part of the Grade C tier of the Grand Prix tennis circuit and was the third leg of the Asian circuit. Ross Case won the singles title.

Finals

Singles
 Ross Case defeated  Geoff Masters 6–1, 6–0
 It was Case's 1st singles title of the year and the 2nd of his career.

Doubles
 Marcello Lara /  Sherwood Stewart defeated  Jürgen Fassbender /  Hans-Jürgen Pohmann 4–6, 7–5, 7–6

References

External links
 International Tennis Federation (ITF) tournament edition details

Milo International Tennis Classic
1973 in Philippine sport
Sports in Manila